In mathematics, a Segal category is a model of an infinity category introduced by , based on work of Graeme Segal in 1974.

References

External links

Category theory